The 2015–16 Gardner–Webb Runnin' Bulldogs men's basketball team represented Gardner–Webb University during the 2015–16 NCAA Division I men's basketball season. The Runnin' Bulldogs, led by third year head coach Tim Craft, played their home games at the Paul Porter Arena and were members of the Big South Conference. They finished the season 17–16, 10–8 in Big South play to finish in a tie for fifth place. They defeated Campbell  and Coastal Carolina to advance to the semifinals of the Big South tournament where they lost to Winthrop.

Roster

Schedule

|-
!colspan=9 style="background:#9C0606; color:white;"| Regular season

|-
!colspan=9 style="background:#9C0606; color:white;"| Big South tournament

References

Gardner–Webb Runnin' Bulldogs men's basketball seasons
Gardner-Webb
Gardner-Webb Runnin' Bulldogs men's basketball
Gardner-Webb Runnin' Bulldogs men's basketball